Rasheed Bank is the second largest Iraqi bank, with 162 inside Iraq. On January 1, 1989, the Rasheed Bank was spun off from Rafidain Bank.

See also

Iraqi dinar

References

External links
 Official website 

Companies based in Baghdad
Economy of Iraq
Banks of Iraq
Banks established in 1988
Iraqi companies established in 1988